Heinrich Schmieder (14 February 1970 – 21 July 2010) was a German actor.

Life 
Heinrich Schmieder was the son of Albanian-Banatdeutsch immigrants. From 1991-1994 he studied acting at the private Zinner Studio in Munich.
 
From 1999 to 2001, Schmieder had the role of the Commissioner Tobias von Sachsen in the TV series Tatort broadcast by Radio Bremen. He appeared alongside Heino Ferch and Sebastian Koch in the internationally successful 2001 TV movie The Tunnel in the role of Theo Lohmann. In 2003 he was nominated for a German Television Award for best actor. In 2004 he was directed by Oliver Hirschbiegel in the role of Rochus Misch in the Oscar-nominated film Downfall. He joined the German Film Academy in 2005.

Schmieder was found dead on 21 July 2010, at the age of 40, by his teammate, in a hotel in Livigno, Italy, while participating in the Bike Transalp. He left behind a wife and two children. The cause of his death is unknown.

Filmography (selection) 
 1992-2006: Tatort (TV series, five episodes) – Kommissar Tobias von Sachsen / Ralf Schaufler / Kalle Seidel
 1992: Wir Enkelkinder – Mephisto
 1995-1996: Against the Wind (TV series) – Boje
 1997: Babes' Petrol – Young Man
 1997: Ein Held – Polizist 2
 1998:  – Klaus Eckleben – jung
 2000: Anniversaries – Thorsten
 2001: The Tunnel – Theo Lohmann
 2001: Dead Man – Richard
 2002: Like Rabbits – Hubert
 2002: Extreme Ops – Goran
 2003: Man Bites Fashion – Tom
 2004:  – Günter
 2004: Downfall – Rochus Misch
 2004: The Fall – Dino
 2005:  – Lehrer
 2005-2008: A Case for BARZ (TV series)
 2006: Warchild – Tony
 2006: Suspect (TV series, episode:A New Life) – Walter Krohn
 2007: Prague Embassy – Frank Ziesche
 2008: The Suspicion (Short Film) – Udo
 2008: So – Lohman
 2008:  – Pfarrer
 2009: Hitler in Court – Hans Ehard
 2009: Flight into the Night – The Accident at Überlingen – Bernd Wegmann
 2010: Metropolitan Area (TV series, one episode) – Gerd Banzer

Awards 
 Nominated German Television Award

External links 
 Heinrich Schmieder's official website
 
 Variety obituary

External links 

1970 births
2010 deaths
German male television actors
German male film actors
People from Schwäbisch Hall
German people of Albanian descent
20th-century German male actors
21st-century German male actors